These Three Remain is a 2005 historical romance novel by Pamela Aidan. It is the third and final novel in the Fitzwilliam Darcy, Gentleman trilogy, a series of novels examining Jane Austen's 1813 novel Pride and Prejudice from the perspective of Fitzwilliam Darcy, the central male character of that book.

The title uses the words of the First Epistle to the Corinthians, as rendered in the New International Version of the Bible, (1 Corinthians 13): "And now these three remain: faith, hope and love. But the greatest of these is love".

Plot
The novel is set in the later chapters of Pride and Prejudice. After a series of unpleasant experiences while visiting Norwycke Castle (as depicted in the previous novel in the sequence) Fitzwilliam Darcy accompanies his cousin, Colonel Richard Fitzwilliam, to the home of their aunt, Lady Catherine de Bourgh. Although not looking forward to spending time with his self-impressed aunt, Darcy has resolved to use the time to forget what he views as his unacceptable desire for Elizabeth Bennet. Much to his surprise and chagrin, however, she is also in the area visiting her cousin, the pompous clergyman Mr Collins and his new wife (and her close friend) Charlotte, who are frequent visitors to Lady Catherine. Darcy is therefore thrown daily into Elizabeth's company, and finds himself unable to further resist her charms. Driven to jealousy by the developing friendship between Elizabeth and Colonel Fitzwilliam, Darcy finally accepts the strength of his love for her and, after weighing the consideration of her lowly social standing and its possible effect on his future status, decides  to propose marriage to her.

Much to Darcy's shock and anger, however, his proposal is rejected; not only is Elizabeth greatly insulted by Darcy's high-handed manner of proposal, but she has also heard from Colonel Fitzwilliam of Darcy's role in persuading his friend Charles Bingley to break his ties with Jane Bennet, Elizabeth's sister, who is in love with Bingley. Furthermore, she has been poisoned towards him by slanderous lies spread by Darcy's nemesis, George Wickham, and is convinced that Darcy is "the last man in the world whom [she] could ever be prevailed upon to marry". Heartbroken by Elizabeth's refusal and stunned by the depth of her dislike towards him, Darcy decides to put Elizabeth behind him and leaves Rosings, but not before writing her a letter explaining the true history between himself, Wickham, and his sister Georgiana, and attempting to justify his actions regarding Bingley and Jane Bennet.

Upon his return to London, however, Darcy begins acting in an increasingly uncharacteristic and erratic fashion towards his friends and Georgiana, culminating in his unwise acceptance of an invitation to a party held by Lady Sylvanie Monmouth, who attempted to seduce him at Norwycke Castle. She holds Darcy responsible for the death of her mother during those events. He is rescued from calamity by his good friend Lord Dyfed Brougham, a seemingly foppish aristocrat who in actually is a government agent.  Brougham is investigating Sylvanie, who has links to Irish revolutionaries and intends to drug Darcy and then blackmail him into funding their operations. No longer trusting his own judgement, Darcy proceeds to get drunk in a nearby tavern before confessing the entire matter and his relationship with Elizabeth to Brougham. Brougham sympathizes with him but nevertheless criticises Darcy's manner towards Elizabeth. The next morning, Darcy realizes the truth of Brougham's criticisms and is mortified by his own arrogance and pride, resolving to improve himself. He confesses the matter to Georgiana and begins to act in a less arrogant, aloof fashion to those around him.

Soon after, Darcy returns to his estate of Pemberley, and is astonished to find himself once more in the company of Elizabeth, who is on a tour of Derbyshire with her aunt and uncle, the Gardiners. After a chance encounter with Elizabeth, Darcy realises that her behaviour towards him is much warmer than their last meeting, while still guarded. Eager to show that he has taken her criticisms of his character on board and is mending his ways, Darcy makes a sincere effort to make her and her relatives feel comfortable and welcome. He soon finds that he genuinely likes Mr and Mrs Gardiner, and is delighted when, upon introducing Georgiana to Elizabeth, the two women take an instant liking to each other. Just as Darcy believes their relationship is thawing, however, Elizabeth receives news from home that her younger sister, Lydia, has eloped with none other than George Wickham, who is fleeing gambling debts accumulated with the other officers in his militia unit.

Determined to help Elizabeth in any possible way, Darcy returns to London and, unknown to either the Bennets or the Gardiners, uses Dyfed Brougham's contacts in the London demimonde to quickly find Wickham and Lydia. After failing to persuade Lydia to leave Wickham, Darcy proceeds to blackmail and bribe Wickham into marrying her, assuring Wickham's future good conduct by buying his many debts. This carries the implicit threat that Darcy will have Wickham sent to debtors' prison if he misbehaves. Darcy also purchases for him a commission in an obscure army regiment whose home barracks are in Newcastle upon Tyne, over two hundred miles from Lydia's family. Wickham is forced to agree, and after Darcy has approached the Gardiners with this plan (on the condition that his own role in the affair be kept secret), Wickham and Lydia are married.

Soon after, Bingley decides to return to his estate at Netherfield, to which he invites Darcy; upon seeing Jane Bennet and Bingley reunited, Darcy guiltily confesses his role in keeping the two separate. Bingley is angry, but quickly forgives Darcy; after straightening out the misunderstanding, Bingley and Jane are soon engaged. After hearing a false report that Elizabeth Bennet and Darcy are also to be married, an outraged Lady Catherine arrives at Darcy's London home having attempted to bully Elizabeth into promising to never enter into an engagement with Darcy. Darcy is elated when he learns that Elizabeth refused, realizing that her feelings towards him might have changed, and he returns to Netherfield. Once again, Darcy proposes to Elizabeth; this time she happily accepts, and the two are married.

Relationship to Pride and Prejudice
These Three Remain quite closely follows the plot of the last chapters of Austen's novel, primarily because Elizabeth Bennet is once again in the picture.  Unique to this book are its vivid glimpses of Regency London's high society, underworld, and political scene.  Some compelling characters are new creations (Lady Monmouth and Lord Brougham, for example), while others (like Colonel Fitzwilliam and Anne de Bourgh) are given much more color and depth.  Anne de Bourgh reveals herself to be a budding writer of novels and not at all interested in becoming mistress of a great country house, as Lady Catherine intends. In doing so, she relieves Darcy of any obligation to consider marriage to her, allowing him to propose to Elizabeth.

References to historical people, places and events
The author chose to set the novels in the trilogy in a definite historical time, namely late 1811 to late 1812.  Letters between characters are dated appropriately.  Contemporary events are referenced, and in some cases have a significant effect on the plot.

At Lady Sylvanie's house Darcy is questioned by a man whom Lady Sylvanie addresses as "Bellingham", and who is a fervent supporter of the cause of Irish independence from Britain.  Later in the novel Dy Brougham is unable to directly help Darcy locate Wickham as he is involved in the investigation of the assassination of Spencer Perceval, the then Prime Minister.  The actual event involved a man named John Bellingham.  However the real-life Bellingham was carrying out a grudge that had nothing to do with Ireland.

There are also references to the War of 1812 where the United States of America attacked Canada, provoking a British response that included an attack on the US capital.  One character mentions that Darcy is trading with the US even though the two countries are at war.  Dy Brougham re-appears late in the novel having been on a secret mission to America.

See also

 List of literary adaptations of Pride and Prejudice

2005 British novels
American romance novels
American historical novels
Novels based on Pride and Prejudice
2005 American novels